The European School, Brussels II is one of thirteen European Schools in the European Union (EU), and of four in Brussels. It is situated on Avenue Oscar Jespers, in the Brussels suburb of Woluwe-Saint-Lambert.

The school is an all-through school catering for nursery, primary and secondary pupils, culminating in the awarding of the European Baccalaureate as its secondary leaving qualification. Pupils of the school are enrolled in either the Dutch], English, French], German, Italian, Finnish, Swedish, Lithuanian, Portuguese, Latvian or Estonian language sections. Founded in 1974 after the first enlargement of the European Communities, the European School, Brussels II prioritises, the children of EU staff for enrolment purposes. Children of non-EU staff may enrol provided there is capacity. However, the School has been filled above its theoretical student capacity for multiple years. Enrolment in the four Brussels based European Schools is administered centrally.

See also 
European School
European Schools
European School, Brussels I
European School, Brussels III
European School, Brussels IV
European School of Bruxelles-Argenteuil

References

External links 
 

International schools in Brussels
Brussels II
Secondary schools in Brussels
Educational institutions established in 1974
1974 establishments in Belgium